The Walter C. Koerner Library is an academic library at the Vancouver campus of the University of British Columbia. The library is named after Walter C. Koerner, a Canadian businessman and philanthropist. Walter C. Koerner Library forms the main academic and general resource library collection at the University of British Columbia.

References

University of British Columbia
University of British Columbia libraries
Academic libraries in Canada